Hervé Jean Robert Giraud (born 26 February 1957) is a French Catholic prelate currently serving as the archbishop of Sens-Auxerre.

Early life

He was born on 26 February 1957 in Tournon-sur-Rhône, Ardèche, ordained priest on 24 September 1985 
and was Auxiliary Bishop of Lyon between 2003 and 2007.
 He was Coadjutor Bishop of Soissons from November 2007 and full Bishop of Soissons since February 2008.

Episcopal career

Within the Conference of Bishops of France, he was elected in 2005 president of the Commission for the ordained and the laity in ecclesial mission. On 8 November 2008 he was re-elected president of the commission for a term of three years.
In 2011, he became president of the Council for communication

When named a bishop he was the youngest French bishop.  Bishop Hervé Giraud was also the first French Bishop to have a social network, Twitter, account under the name @mgrgiraud. He has also published a book Twitthomélies.

See also
 Catholic Church in France
 List of the Roman Catholic dioceses of France

References

External links

1957 births
Living people
Bishops of Soissons
People from Tournon-sur-Rhône
21st-century Roman Catholic bishops in France